Hippeastrum petiolatum (Azucena de Río) is a flowering perennial herbaceous bulbous plant, in the family Amaryllidaceae, distributed from Paraguay to Uruguay and Argentina.

Description
Hippeastrum petiolatum grows to a height of 30–40 cm. Leaves are lanceolate, and dark green, forming a basal rosette around 60 cm in diameter. They grow to a length of 20–50 cm. There are up to three scapes per bulb. The paraperigonium consists of minute scales at the throat of the tepal tube, whose segments are unequal and ruffled and 1–2 cm broad at the middle and 15 cm long. Perigone 6–7 cm. The showy flowers are 10 cm in diameter, scarlet-red with purple veins, greenish-yellow in the throat and usually 3–4 in number but may be 5 rarely. Stigma trifid. Bulbs large (10 to 15 cm in diameter).

Taxonomy 
Described by Ferdinand Albin Pax in 1889.

Heterotypic Synonyms

Hippeastrum flammigerum E.Holmb., Anales Mus. Nac. Buenos Aires, ser. 3, 1: 411 (1902).
Amaryllis flammigera (E.Holmb.) Traub & Uphof, Herbertia 5: 127 (1938).
Amaryllis argilagae Traub, Pl. Life 23: 59 (1967).
Amaryllis petiolata subsp. cochunensis Ravenna, Pl. Life 26: 78 (1970).
Hippeastrum argilagae (Traub) Dutilh, Taxon 46: 16 (1997).

Cultivation 
Full sun to part shade, moist but well drained soil, or pots. Leaves may persist all year under optimum conditions. Reproduction is solely by lateral bulbils, and bears no fruit.

Ecology 
Spring flowering.

Uses 
Cut flowers.

References

Sources 
 
 GBIF: Hippeastrum petiolatum
 Pacific Bulb Society: Hippeastrum petiolatum
 
 International Bulb Society: Hippeastrum petiolatum (image)

Flora of South America
petiolatum
Garden plants of South America